The Macrazelota cervina is a grasshopper also known as the common pig-head. It can be found in some parts of Australia.

References

Caelifera
Insects of Australia